Gerrit Jan Komrij (30 March 1944 – 5 July 2012) was a Dutch poet, novelist, translator, critic, polemic journalist and playwright. He rose to prominence in the early 1970s, writing poetry that sharply contrasted with the free-form poetry of his contemporaries. He acquired a reputation for his prose in the late 1970s, writing acerbic essays and columns often critical of writers, television programs, and politicians. As a literary critic and especially as an anthologist he had a formative influence on Dutch literature: his 1979 anthology of Dutch poetry of the 19th and 20th centuries, reformed the canon, and was followed by anthologies of Dutch poetry of the 17th and 18th centuries, of Afrikaans poetry, and of children's poetry. Those anthologies and a steady stream of prose and poetry publications solidified his reputation as one of the country's leading writers and critics; he was awarded the highest literary awards including the P. C. Hooft Award (1993), and from 2000 to 2004, he was the Dutch Dichter des Vaderlands (Poet Laureate). Komrij died in 2012 at age 68.

Biography
Gerrit Jan Komrij was born on 30 March 1944 in the eastern Dutch town of Winterswijk, Gelderland. He soon moved to Amsterdam and began a literary career. In 1968 his first volume of poetry was published, Maagdenburgse halve bollen en andere gedichten, and in 1969 he became editor of the Bert Bakker-founded literary magazine Maatstaf. In the seventies he also became a critic of television, literature, and architecture, well-feared for his colorful and sarcastic language.

In the 1970s and 1980s, Komrij and his partner Charles Hofman befriended a number of Dutch authors including Boudewijn Büch, with whom he maintained a lengthy correspondence. In the early 1980s Komrij and Hofman moved to Portugal, not long after his play Het Chemisch Huwelijk premiered in Amsterdam; he lived in Portugal ever since. Komrij gave the 2008 Mosse Lecture, titled Waarom zijn Nederlanders zo dol op homoseksuelen? (Why are the Dutch so fond of homosexuals?).

His death, in 2012, was met with widespread praise for his work. Poet laureate Ramsey Nasr, who cited Komrij as one of inspirations, wrote a poem for him, and Queen Beatrix sent her condolences via telegram to Charles Hofman, saying that the Netherlands had lost a great poet.

Lyrics
Komrij wrote librettos to two operas: Symposium by Peter Schat (1994), and Melodias Estranhas by Antonio Chagas Rosa (2000).

He supplied lyrics to two collaborative ventures with the Dutch vocal ensemble Camerata Trajectina. The first was in reconstructing song texts to Dutch songs by Jacob Obrecht (2005). The second was in lyrics for the chamber choral cycle De Seven Zonden van Jeroen Bosch (The Seven Sins of Hieronymus Bosch) set to largely anonymous 16th Century tunes (2009). The theme of the Seven Sins follows the depiction in The Seven Deadly Sins and the Four Last Things a painting Hieronymus Bosch completed in 1485.

Prose
Besides being a critic of poetry and culture in general, Komrij wrote several semi-autobiographical works, including Verwoest Arcadië ('Arcadia Demolished', 1980) and Demonen ('Demons', 2003). He also authored several novels, Over de bergen ('Over the Mountains'), Dubbelster ('Double Star') and De klopgeest ('Poltergeist').

Books about books, anthologies
Komrij was a collector of rare and absurd books (a hobby he shared with Boudewijn Büch), and has written extensively about them. Old homosexual literature, quaint 18th and 19th century poets, and ancient literature about farting are some of his more remarkable subjects. His articles and essays were collected in books such as like Verzonken boeken ('Sunk Books'), Averechts ('The Other Way') and Kakafonie ('Cacaphonia')--the latter subtitled An Encyclopedia of Shit. In 1979 Komrij published a new standard Dutch poetry anthology, De Nederlandse poëzie van de 19de en 20ste eeuw in 1000 en enige gedichten ("Dutch poetry of the 19th and 20th century in 1000 and some poems'), which quickly became the yardstick by which poets were measured. It was soon followed by a volume of 17th and 18th century poetry, an anthology of South African poets, and an anthology of medieval poems. He also edited various other anthologies, one about mothers and one selecting poetry by Jacob Israël de Haan.

Komrij has translated from many different languages, including all of Shakespeare's plays.

Awards

His prose was recognized in 1979, when he was awarded the Busken Huet award. In 1993, Komrij received the P.C. Hooft Award, the chief literary accolade in the Dutch language area, for his prose. For his poetry, he won the poetry prize of the city of Amsterdam in 1970, for Alle vlees is als gras, and the Herman Gorter prize in 1982, for De os op de klokketoren.

Select bibliography

Autobiography
Verwoest Arcadië. [Arcadia Demolished, slightly fictional autobiography.] Privé-Domein 59. Amsterdam: Arbeiderspers, 1980. .
Intimiteiten. [Intimacies; autobiographical essays.] Amsterdam: Arbeiderspers, 1993. .
Demonen. [Demons; "autobiographical stories."] Amsterdam: De Bezige Bij, 2003. .
Eendagsvliegen. [Mayflies; diary entries 1965-2005.] Amsterdam: De Bezige Bij, 2005. .

Prose fiction
Een zakenlunch in Sintra en andere Portuguese verhalen. [A Business Lunch in Sintra and other Portuguese Stories; 28 short stories.] Amsterdam: Arbeiderspers, 1995. .
De klopgeest. [The Poltergeist; novel.] Amsterdam: De Bezige Bij, 2001. .

Prose criticism
Lood en hagel. [Lead and Hail; anthology of 'ad hominem' essays.] Amsterdam: Arbeiderspers, 1998. .
Vreemd pakhuis. [Strange Warehouse; collection of essays on authors and literature.] Amsterdam: De Bezige Bij, 2001. .

Poetry
Twee werelden. [Two Worlds; cycle of 8 sonnets on European unification in Dutch, Danish, German, English, French, Greek, Italian, Portuguese, Spanish.] Amsterdam: Arbeiderspers, 1987. .
Rook zonder vuur. [Smoke Without Fire; 20 sonnets.] The Hague: Stupers Van der Heijden, 1998. .
52 Sonnetten bij het Verglijden van de Eeuw. [52 Sonnets on the Passing of the Century.] Amsterdam: Bert Bakker, 2000. .
Luchtspiegelingen: Gedichten, voornamelijk elegisch. [Mirages: Poems, mainly Elegiac; 47 poems.] Amsterdam: De Bezige Bij, 2001. .
Komrij's patentwekker. [Komrij's Patented Alarm Clock; 12 poems detailing the rectal insertion of a burning candle to function as an alarm clock.] Illustrations by Dick Matena. Originally published 1974. Amsterdam: De Bezige Bij, 2007. .
Onherstelbaar verbeterd. ["Irreparably improved"; 5 pastiches of canonical Dutch sonnets, and 5 original sonnets by Komrij.] C. J. Aarts, 1981.
Alle gedichten. [All Poems; collected poetry.] 4th, enlarged edition, Amsterdam: De Bezige Bij, 2018. .

Encyclopedia
Komrij's Kakafonie: Encyclopedie van de stront. [Komrij's Cacaphonia: An Encyclopedia of Shit.] Amsterdam: De Bezige Bij, 2006. .

Anthologies
De Afrikaanse poëzie in 1000 en enige gedichten. [Afrikaans Poetry in 1001 Poems; anthology of South-African poetry.] Amsterdam: Bert Bakker, 1999. .
De Afrikaanse poëzie, 10 gedichten en een lexicon. [Afrikaans Poetry, 10 Poems and a Lexicon; 10 South-African poems with explications and glossary.] Amsterdam: Bert Bakker, 1999. .

References

 Bom, Onno. Het fabeldier dat Komrij heet. The Hague/Amsterdam: Letterkundig Museum/De Bezige Bij, 2004. .

External links

 Lucifer in het hooi ('Lucifer in Hay') - Weblog Gerrit Komrij

20th-century Dutch novelists
21st-century Dutch novelists
20th-century Dutch poets
21st-century Dutch poets
20th-century Dutch male writers
20th-century Dutch dramatists and playwrights
20th-century translators
20th-century essayists
21st-century essayists
21st-century Dutch male writers
Dutch male poets
Dutch gay writers
Dutch poets laureate
Dutch essayists
Dutch television critics
Dutch literary critics
Dutch encyclopedists
Dutch translators
Dutch columnists
Dutch male novelists
Dutch journalists
Anthologists
Dutch LGBT poets
Dutch LGBT novelists
Dutch LGBT dramatists and playwrights
Gay dramatists and playwrights
Gay novelists
Gay poets
P. C. Hooft Award winners
Male essayists
Dutch male dramatists and playwrights
People from Winterswijk
1944 births
2012 deaths